John McCrea may refer to:

 John McCrea (actor), British actor and singer
 John McCrea (musician) (born 1964), lead singer of the band Cake
 John Frederick McCrea (1854–1894), South African Victoria Cross recipient
 John L. McCrea (1891–1990), American naval officer
 John McCrea (Royal Navy officer) (1829–1883), British admiral
 John McCrea (comics) (born 1966), comic book artist

See also
 John McCrae (1872–1918), Canadian poet, physician, author, artist and soldier
 John Mecray (1937–2017), American realist painter
John Macrae (disambiguation)